There are two species of lizard named Jamaican galliwasp:

 Celestus crusculus
 Celestus molesworthi